Bridge Creek is a town in Grady County, Oklahoma, United States. As of the 2010 census, the town population was 336.

History
Bridge Creek was incorporated as a town in 2000. The town proper and the unincorporated areas that its limits enclose are part of a rapidly growing area of northern McClain and Grady counties known as the "Tri-City Area" with Newcastle, Tuttle and Blanchard.

Bridge Creek was one of several communities hardest hit by an F5 tornado in the deadly May 3, 1999, tornado outbreak. At least 12 people died in the Bridge Creek area. This is the highest wind speed ever recorded on Earth.

The town was hit again by an EF3 tornado on May 6, 2015, 16 years and 3 days after the 1999 tornado. Homes were destroyed or heavily damaged.

Geography
Bridge Creek is located in northeastern Grady County at  (35.247350, −97.723460). It is bordered to the north, west, and southwest by the city of Tuttle, to the south by the city of Blanchard, and to the east by the city of Newcastle in McClain County.

Interstate 44, the H. E. Bailey Turnpike, forms the southeastern border of the town, leading northeast  to downtown Oklahoma City and southwest  to Chickasha, the Grady County seat. Oklahoma State Highway 4, the H. E. Bailey Turnpike Norman Spur, leads north through the center of Bridge Creek and continues north  to Mustang.

Demographics

References

External links
 Bridge Creek Public Schools
 About the May 3, 1999 Tornado

Oklahoma City metropolitan area
Towns in Grady County, Oklahoma
Towns in Oklahoma